Don Vassos (born 1938) is a Canadian football player who played for the  BC Lions, Saskatchewan Roughriders and Edmonton Eskimos. He previously played football for the University of British Columbia.

References

1938 births
Living people
Edmonton Elks players
Players of Canadian football from Saskatchewan
Sportspeople from Regina, Saskatchewan